The 1875–1876 New Zealand general election was held between 20 December 1875 and 29 January 1876 to elect a total of 88 MPs in 73 electorates to the 6th session of the New Zealand Parliament. The Māori vote was held on 4 and 15 January 1876. A total of 56,471 voters were registered.

Background
Political parties had not been established yet; this only happened after the 1890 election.  The previous parliament had 78 representatives from 72 electorates. In October 1875, Parliament passed the Representation Act 1875,  and resolved to increase the size of Parliament to 88 representatives through the following changes:
 one additional member for City of Dunedin (from two to three)
 the single member electorates of Christchurch East and Christchurch West to amalgamate and form the City of Christchurch electorate with three members
 one additional member for Timaru ( was formed as a new electorate)
 one additional member for Waitaki (from one to two)
 one additional member for Grey Valley (from one to two)
 one additional member for Wanganui (from one to two)
 a new  electorate (with one member)

With the two new electorates and the amalgamation in Christchurch, the number of electorates thus increased by one to 73. Eleven of the electorates were two-member electorates; two electorates were three-member electorates. To split Timaru into two electorates was proposed by the Timaru incumbent, Edward Stafford. The new electorate for the Waikato, Waipa, was added on the proposal put forward by William Jackson, who retired at the end of the parliamentary term in 1875.

The election was held over six weeks in December 1875 and January 1876.  The date of election is defined here as the day on which the poll took place, or if there was no contest, the day of nomination.  The first elections were held on 20 December 1875 in the City of Dunedin and City of Nelson electorates, returning a total of five members.  In Dunedin, the three positions were contested by eight candidates.  In Nelson, 20 December was the nomination day and the two candidates were returned unopposed.  In two electorates, elections were held on Christmas Eve, while 19 candidates were elected between Christmas and New Year.

The last election was held in the  electorate on 29 January 1876 between Arthur Seymour and George Henderson.  Seymour was successful. Elections in the Maori electorates were held on 4 January Southern Maori and 15 January (all other Maori electorates).  A total of 56,471 voters were registered.

George Grey stood in the general election for both the Auckland West and the Thames electorates. In the two-member Auckland electorate, only Grey and Patrick Dignan were put forward as candidates, and were thus declared elected on 22 December 1875. The two-member Thames electorate was contested by six candidates, including Julius Vogel (who was Premier in 1875), William Rowe and Charles Featherstone Mitchell. On election day (6 January 1876), Grey attracted the highest number of votes and, unexpectedly, Rowe beat Vogel into second place (Vogel also stood in Wanganui, where he was returned). Hence Grey and Rowe were declared elected for Thames. A protest against Grey's election was lodged with the returning officer the following day, stating that Grey had not been eligible to stand in Thames as he had already been elected in Auckland West. This petition was filed to the House of Representatives at the end of January.

With this controversy going on for several months unresolved, Grey advised in mid June 1876 in a series of telegrams that he had chosen to represent Auckland West. On 8 July, the report of the committee inquiring into his election for Thames was read to the House. It was found that this was in accordance with the law, but that he had to make a decision for which electorate he would sit. On 15 July 1876, Grey announced that he would represent Thames, and he moved that a by-election be held in Auckland West for the seat that he would vacate there.

The Government received a majority over the opposition in the election, but with political parties not forming until 1890, precise numbers cannot be given. One newspaper counted 48 of the members as Government supporters.  On 15 February 1876, the Pollen Ministry led by Daniel Pollen resigned.  Julius Vogel, who had been Premier prior to Pollen, formed a new ministry and became Premier again.

Result

Notes

References